This is a list of events in Scottish television from 1985.

Events

January
4 January – The last 405-line transmissions take place in Scotland. The switch-off sees the ending of television signals being radiated from the Kirk o' Shotts transmitting station.

February
18 February – BBC One Scotland changes its name back to BBC 1 Scotland.

March
No events.

April
April – Grampian Television introduces a new computerised logo.

May
No events.

June
No events.

July
No events.

August
31 August – Scottish Television changes its "STV" logo to the computerised "thistle" design.

September
No events.

October
October – Increased funding for programmes in Gaelic results in the introduction of a weekday 20-minute morning slot of Gaelic children's programmes on BBC One Scotland. The programmes are generally shown in term-time before Play School, starting at 10:10am.

November
No events.

December
No events.

Television series
Scotsport (1957–2008)
Reporting Scotland (1968–1983; 1984–present)
Top Club (1971–1998)
Scotland Today (1972–2009)
Sportscene (1975–present)
The Beechgrove Garden (1978–present)
Grampian Today (1980–2009)
Take the High Road (1980–2003)
Now You See It (1981–1986)
Taggart (1983–2010)
Crossfire on Grampian (1984–2004)
City Lights (1984–1991)

Births
20 March – Phil MacHugh, television presenter

Deaths
26 January – Chic Murray, 65, comedian and actor

See also
1985 in Scotland

References

 
Television in Scotland by year
1980s in Scottish television